2011 outbreak may refer to:

Tornado outbreaks

2011 Super Outbreak
2011 Hackleburg–Phil Campbell tornado
2011 Tuscaloosa–Birmingham tornado
2011 Philadelphia, Mississippi tornado
2011 Smithville, Mississippi tornado
Tornado outbreak of April 14–16, 2011
Tornado outbreak sequence of May 21–26, 2011
Derecho and tornado outbreak of April 4–5, 2011
Tornado outbreak of April 9–11, 2011 
2011 New England tornado outbreak
Tornado outbreak sequence of April 19–24, 2011
Tornado outbreak of June 18–22, 2011
Tornado outbreak of November 14–16, 2011

Other uses
2011 Germany E. coli O104:H4 outbreak, a foodborne illness outbreak
2011 dengue outbreak in Pakistan, a dengue fever outbreak in Pakistan
2011 Bulgaria foot-and-mouth disease outbreak, a Bulgaria foot-and-mouth disease outbreak
2011 United States listeriosis outbreak, an outbreak of listeriosis

See also
April 2011 tornado outbreak (disambiguation)